Elizabeth Paterson-Brown  (28 January 1929 – 13 January 2009) was a Scottish curler who held the position of vice-president for the World Curling Federation from 1990 to 1994. She was awarded the Freytag Award in 1996 and inducted into the WCF Hall of Fame in 2002. Paterson-Brown was named a Member of the Order of the British Empire in 1999.

Career
After completing her education, Paterson-Brown worked in her father's wool business. In 1966, Paterson-Brown started her curling career when she became the president of the Ford Ladies Curling Club. Later on, she joined the Royal Caledonian Curling Club as a member and became president of Royal Caledonian's ladies curling division from 1987 to 1988. Following her times as president, Paterson-Brown became the vice-president of the World Curling Federation in 1990 and held the position until 1994. Outside of her career as vice-president, Paterson-Brown was a secretary and skip during a 1981 ladies curling tournament for Scotland.

Awards and honours
In 1996, Paterson-Brown was awarded the World Curling Federation Freytag Award. She was later inducted into the WCF Hall of Fame upon establishment in 2012. Paterson-Brown was also named a Member of the Order of the British Empire at the 1999 Birthday Honours.

Personal life
Paterson-Brown was born on 28 January 1929 in Edinburgh, Scotland. She completed a secretarial course in London's Denson College.

Paterson-Brown was married with two children. She died in Edinburgh on 13 January 2009.

References

External links
 

1929 births
2009 deaths
Scottish female curlers
Members of the Order of the British Empire